Holland is an unincorporated community in the southeast corner of Allen County, Kentucky, United States. The community, primarily a rural area on farmland, is approximately 10 miles east of  Scottsville.

A post office was established in the community in 1881, and named for early settler, William Holland.

A tornado hit near Holland around 2 AM on Wednesday, February 6, 2008, killing 4 people and injuring several more.

There is an Old Order Mennonite community in Holland, that started as one of the "Christian Communities" founded by Elmo Stoll. Soon after the early death of Elmo Stoll in 1998, the "Christian Communities" began to disband. The community in Holland then decided to join the Noah Hoover Mennonites in nearby Scottsville.

Notes

Unincorporated communities in Allen County, Kentucky
Unincorporated communities in Kentucky